Leanne Carol Callaghan (born 1 January 1972) is an English ski mountaineer and mountain climber.

Callaghan was born in Bury, Lancashire. During her studies at the Medical College, she joined the Territorial Army and after graduation she joined the regular army as a medical officer for six years. While she served in the army, she started mountain climbing. Amongst other notable ascents, she was the first female leader of "Neanderthal" - Scottish grade VII,7 on Lost Valley Buttress, Glen Coe in January 2010. Her partner was Will Woodhead.

Her first ski mountaineering competition was a World Cup race. At the 2011 World Championship of Ski Mountaineering, she participated in the women's relay team (together with Diahanne Gilbert and Gabriel Lees), which finished ninth.

Currently she works as an anaesthetist in Aintree University Hospital, Merseyside, England.

References

External links
Leanne Callaghan, skimountaineering.org

1972 births
Living people
British female ski mountaineers
English mountain climbers
Sportspeople from Bury, Greater Manchester
Royal Army Medical Corps officers
Alumni of the University of Sheffield
English anaesthetists
English female skiers
Female climbers
Women anesthesiologists